Ommatoiulus sabulosus, also known as the striped millipede, is a European millipede of the family Julidae. Its common name comes from its two striking bright longitudinal bands on the dorsal surface.

O. sabulosus is widespread and common in Central Europe and on the British Isles. It has a broad habitat range, including open areas such as meadows, fields, and roadside edges as well as sandy soils and the leaf-litter of forests of pine, oak, and beech trees. O. sabulosus occurs at elevations ranging from sea level up to 2800 metres. 
O. sabulosus occasionally occurs in large numbers and mass migrations, they are very useful animals because they are excellent scavengers, they eat foliage, rotten wood and other dead plant material, producing humus that is exploited by plants for growth  . Geographic subspecies or 'forms' include Ommatoiulus sabulosus aimatopodus.

References

External links
 Striped Millipede - Ommatoiulus sabulosus

Julida
Millipedes of Europe
Taxa named by Carl Linnaeus
Animals described in 1758